KAAR (92.5 FM) is a commercial radio station in Butte, Montana. KAAR airs the syndicated "U.S. Country" country music format from Jones Radio Networks.

KAAR and its sister stations are all located at 750 Dewey Blvd. in Butte. The rear of this radio facility houses the small studios of local NBC affiliate KTVM Channel 6. KAAR and KMBR share a transmitter site northeast of town, east of Interstate 15. 92.5 KAAR FM was first implemented in 1992 by Bob Toole, who at the time, served as General Manager of Fisher Radio in Butte. In 2002, Fisher acquired broadcaster Tom O'Neill as KAAR FM's morning DJ and Program Director. O'Neill has commanded the KAAR & KMBR air waves for over 20 years, and has successfully impacted listenership.  In early 2019, KAAR FM ranked #1 in the  Nielsen Ratings.

Ownership
In June 2006, KAAR was acquired by Cherry Creek Radio from Fisher Radio Regional Group as part of a 24-station deal with a total reported sale price of $33.3 million.

References

External links
KAAR official website

Country radio stations in the United States
AAR
Radio stations established in 1988
1988 establishments in Montana
Townsquare Media radio stations